Marcos Antonio Gamarra Arbiniagaldez (born 8 July 1988) is a Paraguayan professional footballer who plays as a defender for Paraguayan Primera División club General Díaz.

References

External links
 
 

1988 births
Living people
Paraguayan footballers
Sportspeople from Luque
12 de Octubre Football Club players
Deportivo Capiatá players
General Díaz footballers
Independiente F.B.C. footballers
Sportivo Luqueño players
Paraguayan Primera División players
Paraguayan División Intermedia players
Association football defenders